Henry Pease is the name of:

 Henry R. Pease (1835–1907), U.S. Senator from Mississippi
 Henry Pease (MP) (1807–1881), son of railway pioneer, Edward Pease
 Henry Pease (Peruvian politician) (1944–2014), Peruvian politician
 Henry Fell Pease (1838–1896), British Member of Parliament for Cleveland, 1885–1897